Geirionydd was a rural district in the administrative county of Caernarvonshire, North Wales from 1894 to 1934.

The rural district was formed from the part of Llanrwst Rural Sanitary District in Caernarvonshire. It was named after Llyn Geirionydd.

The district contained the following civil parishes:
The Abbey
Capel Curig: Created 1904 from parts of Gwydir and Llanrhychwyn parishes
Dolwyddelan
Eidda		
Gwydir: Lost areas in 1901 to Bettws Y Coed Urban District, and in 1904 to create Capel Curig parish. Absorbed by Llanrhychwyn in 1905. 
Llanrhychwyn: Lost area in 1904 to create Capel Curig parish. Absorbed Gwydir parish in 1905
Maenan			
Penmachno 		
Trefriw

The rural district was abolished by a County Review Order in 1934, becoming part of Nant Conway Rural District.

Sources
Census of England and Wales: County Report for Carnarvonshire, 1901, 1911, 1921
Census of England and Wales: County Report for Caernarvonshire 1931
Caernarvonshire Administrative County (Vision of Britain)

Caernarfonshire
Rural districts of Wales
1894 establishments in Wales
1934 disestablishments in Wales